Ned Flanders Crossing is a bicycle and pedestrian bridge spanning Interstate 405 to connect Portland, Oregon's Northwest District and Pearl District, in the United States. In 2019, the project's estimated cost was $6 million. It opened in June 2021 and was originally named Flanders Crossing, as it linked the two parts of Flanders Street separated by the interstate, before being re-dedicated to honor The Simpsons character Ned Flanders (himself named for Flanders Street).

Description and history

Construction started in August 2020. The bridge was installed in January 2021, and it was opened to the public on June 4. It was re-dedicated to honor Ned Flanders, a character in The Simpsons and himself named for Flanders Street, in September 2021.

See also
 The Simpsons and Portland, Oregon

References

External links

2021 establishments in Oregon
Bridges completed in 2021
Bridges in Portland, Oregon
Cyclist bridges in the United States
Northwest District, Portland, Oregon
Pearl District, Portland, Oregon
Pedestrian bridges in Oregon